Reza Shekari Qezel Qayah (born May 31, 1998) is an Iranian footballer who plays for Iranian club Gol Gohar as a midfielder.

Club career

Zob Ahan

Shekari joined the Persian Gulf Pro League side Zob Ahan in summer 2015 when he signed a 3-year contract with this Isfahani side. He made his debut for Zob Ahan in 2nd fixtures of 2015–16 Persian Gulf Pro League against Sepahan while he substituted in for Mehdi Rajabzadeh. Shekari scored his first professional goal on 4 November 2015 in a 2–0 Hazfi Cup victory against Persepolis.

After a good season with Zob Ahan, Shekari joined Swiss club FC Basel on a one-week trial in May 2016.

Rubin Kazan
On 31 August 2017, he signed a contract with the Russian Premier League side FC Rubin Kazan, joining compatriot Sardar Azmoun at the club. Shekari was assigned to the U21 team. He made his Russian Premier League debut on 7 April 2018 in a game against FC Akhmat Grozny.

Tractor
On 9 July 2019, Iranian club Tractor confirmed that they officially signed Shekari.

International career

U17
Shekari was part of Iran U17 during 2013 to 2014. He made 8 official appearances for Iran U17 and scored 5 times.

U20
He was invited to Iran U20 by Amir Hossein Peyrovani in 2014. He represented Iran in the AFC U19 Championships in which Iran reached the semi finals and qualified for the World Cup. Shekari scored three goals during the 2017 FIFA U-20 World Cup.

U23
In June 2015, he was invited to the Iran U23 training camp by Mohammad Khakpour.

Personal life
Reza was born in Tehran.

Career statistics

International goals

Iran U23

Honours
Zob Ahan
Hazfi Cup (1): 2015–16
Iranian Super Cup (1): 2016

Tractor
Hazfi Cup (1): 2019–20

References

External links 
 Reza Shekari at IranLeague.ir

1998 births
Living people
Iranian footballers
Iranian expatriate footballers
Zob Ahan Esfahan F.C. players
FC Rubin Kazan players
Tractor S.C. players
Gol Gohar players
Sportspeople from Tehran
Iran youth international footballers
Iran under-20 international footballers
Association football midfielders
Persian Gulf Pro League players
Russian Premier League players
Expatriate footballers in Russia
Iranian expatriate sportspeople in Russia